A spring horizon is an impervious layer of rock reaching the surface, along which springs emerge. Since aquifers and impervious strata often lie on top of one another in horizontal layers, adjacent contact springs often emerge at the same height along a line called the spring horizon.

References 

Springs (hydrology)